China Concepts Stock is a set of stock of companies whose assets or earnings have significant activities in mainland China. The People's Republic of China is undergoing major financial transformation, and many leading mainland-based companies have chosen to list themselves overseas to gain access to foreign investor capital. Currently, there are China Concepts Stocks listed on several major stock exchanges around the globe, including the Hong Kong Stock Exchange (HKEx), Singapore Exchange (SGX), New York Stock Exchange (NYSE), NASDAQ, NYSE MKT (formerly known as the American Stock Exchange), London Stock Exchange (LSE), Euronext, and the Tokyo Stock Exchange (TSE).

United States

Some China Concepts Stocks listed on the NYSE, NASDAQ, and NYSE MKT take the form of American Depositary Receipts (ADR) instead of common stock.

New York Stock Exchange (NYSE)

NASDAQ

NYSE MKT (formerly known as AMEX)

Over-the-Counter (OTC)/Pink Sheets

Canada

Toronto Stock Exchange

Europe

London Stock Exchange (LSE)

Euronext

Frankfurt Stock Exchange (Frankfurter Wertpapierbörse/FWB)

Asia

Hong Kong Stock Exchange (HKEx)

Tokyo Stock Exchange (TSE)

Singapore Exchange (SGX)

See also
 A share
 B share
 H share
 Red chip
 P chip
 S chip
 N share
 L share
 G share
 China Concepts Stock
 S chips scandals

References

External links
Chinese World Net Finance North America Chinese Stock
Yahoo! Finance Chinese Stock Overseas
CNYES.com USA Stock/ADR Market

Stock market
Finance in China
Economy of China-related lists
Lists of companies of China